Fool's Paradise is an upcoming American satirical comedy film written and directed by Charlie Day. The film stars Day, Ken Jeong,  Ray Liotta, Kate Beckinsale, Adrien Brody, Common, Jason Sudeikis, Edie Falco, and John Malkovich.

Premise
A down-on-his-luck publicist (Jeong) gets his lucky break when he discovers a man recently released from a mental health facility (Day) looks just like a method actor who refuses to leave his trailer.

Cast
 Charlie Day 
 Ken Jeong
 Ray Liotta
 Kate Beckinsale
 Adrien Brody
 Common
 Jason Sudeikis
 Edie Falco
 John Malkovich
 Jillian Bell
 Alanna Ubach 
 Travis Fimmel
 Dean Norris
 Edy Ganem 
 Katherine McNamara
 Mary Elizabeth Ellis
 Glenn Howerton
 Jason Bateman
 Jimmi Simpson

Production
It was announced in September 2018 that Charlie Day was set to make his directorial debut on the film, titled El Tonto, in addition to writing and starring in it. The additions of Kate Beckinsale, Jason Sudeikis, Edie Falco, John Malkovich and Jillian Bell to the cast was announced the following month. In October 2018, Ray Liotta (in one of his final roles), Ken Jeong, Adrien Brody, Travis Fimmel, Dean Norris and Edy Ganem were added to the cast. In November 2018, it was announced that Katherine McNamara, Common, Mary Elizabeth Ellis, and Glenn Howerton had joined the cast.

Principal photography began in October 2018 in Los Angeles. In February 2022, Day revealed in an interview that the film had undergone a week of reshoots in December 2021 with Jeong, Brody, Beckinsale, and Liotta after he wrote an additional 27 pages to the screenplay based on the advice of filmmaker Guillermo del Toro, who also suggested the original title of the film be discarded. The film was later retitled Fool's Paradise.

Release
According to Day on his podcast, Fool's Paradise will be released theatrically on May 12, 2023. by Roadside Attractions in the United States and Canada. Lionsgate will distribute on home media.

References

External links

Upcoming films
American comedy films
Films shot in Los Angeles
Upcoming directorial debut films
Roadside Attractions films
2020s satirical films
2023 comedy films
2023 films